John Reilly is an English-Irish football coach and former player. He was most recently the manager of the British Virgin Islands national football team.

Playing career
Born in  Hackney, London to Irish parentage, Reilly played Non-League football for Leytonstone, Ilford and East Ham United.

Coaching career
Following his playing career, Reilly moved to Ireland, coaching at Crumlin United, Malahide United and Home Farm. In 2018, after moving to the islands, Reilly was appointed technical director and manager of the British Virgin Islands national football team.

References

Year of birth missing (living people)
Living people
British Virgin Islands national football team managers
Republic of Ireland association footballers
Republic of Ireland football managers
English footballers
English football managers
Leytonstone F.C. players
Ilford F.C. players
East Ham United F.C. players
Association football coaches
English people of Irish descent
Home Farm F.C. coaches
Association footballers not categorized by position